Shigeru Onishi (大西茂)(1928-1994) was a Japanese visual artist. Onishi produced photography-based work and abstract ink paintings. Michel Tapié introduced Onishi's calligraphic works to Europe with works by the Gutai group artists in the context of the Art Informel movement. These calligraphic works used the sumi method that Japanese painters traditionally use from ink made from soot or oil and animal glue.

He started his artistic career as photographer in 1950 and gradually shifted to abstract ink painting. Although he was a self-educated photographer, he was very familiar with various photographic and photo development techniques. He worked with multiple exposure, development processing with brushes and sponges, discoloration using developing agents, film processing, color tone manipulation using temperature, and other methods. These techniques would often achieve experimental results.

Biography

Early life 
Onishi was born in Takahashi City in Okayama prefecture, Japan. He graduated from the Sixth High School of Takahashi city, focusing on mathematics and the sciences. In a photography magazine introducing Onishi's work, his friend, Tadao Ogura, stated that Onishi showed no interest in his studies, other than two or three subjects. While the students hurried towards the examination centers, he went in the opposite direction to go hiking. Ogura also mentioned that Onishi became interested in divination and created his own system. Onishi was so precocious that he often stumped his philosophy teacher and would stand at the lectern himself to explain difficult topics.

University days 
Onishi entered Hokkaido University to study topology and graduated in 1953. He stayed in Hokkaido to continue his studies in mathematics until 1958 while he worked on his theoretical mathematical treatise, A Study of Meta-Infinite, which can also be considered his life work. Around this time, Onishi began photography to convey his mathematical theories in art. He also scribbled dozens of abstract sketches in red ink every day.

According to Michel Tapié, Onishi was a Buddhist. After graduating from University, Onishi spent time at a Zen temple where he began to work with traditional Japanese sumi ink.  His experimental photography and ink painting both started during his time in Hokkaido.

Artistic career

Early experimental photographic works 1955-1957 
In 1955, Onishi exhibited his first one-person show at Nabis Gallery in Tokyo. In the exhibition pamphlet, he explains that he "used multiple exposure, solarization, and other various techniques… There are some works for which I barely relied on the camera lens." The exhibition pamphlet also includes written contributions from Shuzo Takiguchi and Shigene Kanamaru. At the time, his experimental photographs shocked viewers. Tatsuo Fukushima, a prominent photography critic, wrote: Shigeru Onishi is one of those photographers whose work boldly strikes me with the unease and anguish of an individual living through our times. While his work aggressively takes a stand against all that harms and injures us, I also felt it issues a warning to our tamed souls, which, when confronted with such harmful things, tend to try and proceed by forgetting, evading, deceiving. His photographs shock our numbed souls and teach them to hate that which is hateful. The force they display – the opposite of what we see in the more accommodating salons – could not be more important for this society.In March 1957, Takemiya Gallery in Tokyo held Onishi's second one-person show. It was titled The Second Shigeru Onishi Photography Exhibition and organized by Takiguchi. In an essay for this show, Onishi wrote that the goal of his photography was "to know the conditions of the subject's formation founded on a desire to pursue such metamathematical propositions such as the 'possibility of existence' and 'the possibility of arbitrary work'” He was deeply committed to his pursuit of photography through the lens of mathematics.

Connections to the Subjective Photography Movement 1956-1958 
In 1956, his works were presented in a traveling exhibition organized by Sankei Camera held at the Nihonbashi Takashimaya department store in Tokyo, titled The First International Subjective Photography Exhibition. The show focused on the Subjektive Fotografie movement initiated by the German photographer Otto Steinert and included Japanese artists like Onishi. One year after the exhibition, Onishi's photographs were introduced in a special feature for Subjectivist photographers with other major artists in the movement, such as Kōichi Sako.

In March 1958, Onishi participated in the Japanese Subjective Photography exhibition at the Fuji Photo Salon in Tokyo, organized by the Japan Subjective Photography League, formed two years earlier.

Connections to Gutai 1957-1961 
At this point in his career, Onishi shifted his artistic focus because he felt the mathematical propositions fundamental to him were beyond the scope of photography. He continued his theoretical mathematical treatise, but his artistic production shifted to large-scale abstract ink paintings.

Around this time, he became acquaintances with the French critic Michel Tapié who was involved with the Gutai group. Onishi participated in several shows that the Gutai group hosted through this relationship. In 1957, Contemporary World Art, an international exhibition curated by Tapié, featured Onishi's abstract ink paintings. The show focused on Art Informel and was first exhibited at the Bridgestone Museum of Art in Tokyo, and later at the Daimaru Department Store in Osaka. In 1958, he participated in the Osaka International Festival—The International Art of a New Era: Informel and Gutai, first exhibited in Osaka and later toured to Nagasaki, Hiroshima, Tokyo, and Kyoto. In 1959, he appeared in the Fifteen Japanese Contemporary Artists Recommended by Tapié at Gendai Gallery in Tokyo.

After meeting Tapié, Onishi's works made their first appearance in an exhibition outside Japan in late 1959. The Galerie Stadler in Paris feated his work in an exhibition titled METAMORPHISMES. Rodolphe Stadler opened the gallery in October 1955 and hired Tapié as an artistic advisor.

In May to June 1959, Onishi's work was presented at the exhibition Arte Nuova: Esposizione Internazionale di Pittura e Scultura (“New Art: International Exhition of Painting and Scultpure”) at the Palazzo Graneri in Turin, Italy.

In March 1961, he was included in an exhibition titled Continuité et avant-garde au Japon (“Continuity and the avant-garde in Japan”). The show was held at the now-closed International Center of Aesthetic Research in Turin, which Tapié cofounded.

Although Onishi was featured in several shows with the Gutai group and had many connections to Tapié, it appears that he was never a full member of the Gutai group.

Exhibitions shift to Europe 1960s-1990s 
In April 1960, he had a solo exhibition at Gendai Gallery in Tokyo. This show focusing on his calligraphic works would be his last exhibition in Japan for 20 years. A review by the art critic, Yusuke Nakahara, titled “Intelligent compositions: Shigeru Onishi’s explorations of the possibilities of ink," appeared in the Yomiuri Shimbun newspaper. In it, Nakahara differentiates Onishi's calligraphic work from other typical Japanese calligraphic work. Nakahara states:Onishi's works are expressed in ink, but they create a disparate world from modernist calligraphy. This departure is probably because the artist is deeply familiar with the limitations and possibilities of ink as a material. The world he creates results from his devotion to his singular vision. Onishi’s uniqueness comes from his confluent spatial expression influenced by the streaking subtly shaded lines of the sumi ink. The composition is purified and intellectual. Compared to this, his inner dramatic power is relegated to the background.In 1961, a large-format catalog of Onishi's artworks was published by Edizioni d’Arte Fratelli Pozzo in Turin, entitled Onishi (Baroques Ensemblistes 5). And in March of the same year, he is included in an exhibition at the International Center of Aesthetic Research in Turin, titled Continuité et avant-garde au Japon (“Continuity and the avant-garde in Japan”).

In 1969, the International Center of Aesthetic Research, founded by Tapié, published Onishi's first monograph, titled A Study of Meta-Infinite: Logic of Continuum (1). It is noteworthy because Onishi's theoretical treatise fills the pages of the monograph. The following year, Orangerie Multiples in Cologne published his collected theoretical writings, Super Function Theory.

Although Onishi's abstract ink paintings were widely exhibited and published from the 1950s to the 1970s throughout Europe, he did not keep the company of international art circles. In Europe, his abstract calligraphic works were well received, but his earlier photographic works were largely ignored.

Over the years, critics tried to tie Onishi to many artistic movements, but Onishi never associated himself with any specific movement. He did not join Gutai though heavily involved with Tapié, and he shifted away from photography, so he was never fully engaged in the subjective photography movement. Onishi stayed in Okayama and continued to work on his primary endeavor, his mathematical research, until his death in 1994.

From the late 70s into the 90s, his calligraphic works and In Search for the Meta-Infinite were included in group shows at the Nara Prefectural Museum of Art, Okayama Cultural Center, and the National Museum of Art, Osaka.

In an introductory essay Tapié wrote for A Study of the Meta-Infinite, Tapié describes a personal episode when he met Onishi for Osaka's International Sky Festival in 1960. When Onishi arrived in Osaka, he was so excited to see Tapié and explain his new mathematical discoveries that the translator couldn't keep up with his highly specialized vocabulary borrowed from French, English, and German. Tapié recalls Onishi's passion captivated him.

Posthumous career 
After Onishi died in Okayama city in 1994, his body of work was consigned to two different parties. The Onishi estate consigned his paintings to the Okayama Prefectural Museum of Art, and they consigned his photographic works to Ryuichi Kaneko, a photo historian and curator at the TOP Museum (formerly known as: Tokyo Metropolitan Museum of Photography). In 2014, Kaneko, a prolific photobook collector and researcher, curated an solo exhibition focusing on Onishi’s photographic works, titled Shigeru Onishi: Elusive Avant-Garde Photographer at Galarie Omotesando in Tokyo. 

In 2017, MEM, a Tokyo-based gallery, held a solo exhibition of Onishi’s photographic works at their booth at Paris Photo. Although Onishi’s calligraphic paintings had been shown internationally through his connections with Tapié in Europe, this 2017 exhibition at Paris Photo was the first time that Onishi's photographic works were shown to an international audience. This became the launching pad for the reevaluation of Onishi’s career as a painter and a mathematician through the lens of his career as a photographer. 

This exhibition rekindled international interest in his work. His photographic works are then absorbed into collections at MoMA, New York Public Library, and Bombas Gens Centre d’Art, València. His photographic works are featured in the group exhibition Collection 1940s–1970s at MoMA in New York City from 2019 to 2020 for the first show inaugurating the reopening of the museum after its large-scale renovation. He was then featured in his first solo museum exhibition outside of Japan at Foam Photography Museum, Amsterdam, and Bombas Gens Centre d’Art, València from 2021 to 2022. 

In 2021, Steidl published the first monograph on Onishi’s photographic works titled A Metamathematical Proposition, which was designed and edited by Manfred Heiting, a preeminent photography collector, researcher, and educator, in collaboration with MEM. The volume contains an essay by Ryuichi Kaneko in which he tries to position Onishi within the larger history of Japanese photography and modern photography, he writes: Having blasted onto the photography scene in the late 1950s, Shigeru Onishi never found a place for himself there, despite being noticed by some critics and periodicals. And although he earned praise for the works he presented as part of the Informalism movement's glamorous worldwide activities, It is fair to say that his photographic output immediately preceding his transition to abstract ink has been almost totally overlooked... This may well be because he refused to situate his own creations within critical frameworks that fit their visual style or methods, such as Informalism or subjective photography… I am confident that his photography has the potential to reframe our historical understanding of post-war Japanese photography, and yet more, to deconstruct the very institution of modern photography.

Solo exhibitions 
1955: The First Shigeru Onishi Photography Exhibition, Nabis Gallery, Tokyo, Japan
1957: The Second Shigeru Onishi Photography Exhibition, Takemiya Gallery, Tokyo, Japan
1960: Solo Exhibition, Gendai Gallery, Tokyo, Japan
2014: Shigeru Onishi: Elusive Avant-Garde Photographer, Galerie Omotesando, Tokyo, Japan
2021-2022: Shigeru Onishi: The Possibility of Existence, Foam Fotografiemuseum Amsterdam, Amsterdam, Netherlands
2022–2023: Shigeru Onishi: In Search of Meta-Infinite, Bombas Gens Centre d'Art, València, Spain

Group exhibitions 
1956: The First International Subjective Photography Exhibition, Nihonbashi Takashimaya Department Store, Tokyo, Japan
1957: Contemporary World Art, Bridgestone Museum of Art, Tokyo, Japan
1957: Contemporary World Art, Daimaru Department Store, Osaka, Japan
1958: Osaka International Festival—The International Art of a New Era, Informel and Gutai, Namba Takashimaya Department Store, Osaka, Japan
1958: Japanese Subjective Photography, Fuji Photo Salon, Tokyo, Japan
1959: Arte Nuova: Esposizione Internazionale di Pittura e Scultura (“New Art: International Exhibition of Painting and Sculpture”), Palazzo Graneri, Turin, Italy
1959: Fifteen Japanese Contemporary Artists Recommended by Tapie, Gendai Gallery, Tokyo, Japan
1959: MÉTAMORPHISMES, Galerie Stadler, Paris, France
1960: International Sky Festival, Namba Takashimaya Department Store, Osaka, Japan
1961: Continuité et avant-garde au Japon (“Continuity and the avant-garde in Japan”). International Center of Aesthetic Research, Turin, Italy
1962: Strutture e Stile. Pitture e sculture di 42 artisti d’Europa, America e Giappone (“Structures and Style: Paintings and Sculptures by 42 Artists from Europe, America, and Japan”), Galleria Civica d’Arte Moderna, Turin, Italy
1964: Intuiciones y realizaciones formales (“Intuitions and Formalizations”), Centro de Artes Visuales, Instituto Torcuato Di Tella, Buenos Aires, Argentina
1964: Esposizione dei Pittori (“The Painters’ Exhibition”), International Center of Aesthetic Research, Turin, Italy
1965: Le baroque généralisé, International Center of Aesthetic Research, Turin, Italy
1969: Isologie–Homologie–Analogie : D'un esprit exact, d'un espace lyrique. D'un espace exact, d'un esprit lyrique. Serpan–Filhos–Onishi, Galerie Stadler, Paris, France
1973: Maîtres du Japon : Insho, Onishi, Suzuki, Teshigahara (“Masters of Japan: Insho, Onishi, Suzuki, Teshigahara”), Galerie Albert Verbeke, Paris, France
1977: Nihon no chūshō kaiga: Anforumeru o chūshin to shite (“Abstract Painting in Japan: With a Focus on Informalism”), Okayama Cultural Center, Okayama, Japan
1981: Ōhashi Kaichi korekushon kara: Gendai bijutsu no sekai (“From the Kaichi Ohashi Collection: The World of Contemporary Art”), Nara Prefectural Museum of Arts, Nara, Japan
1985: Action et emotion, peintures des années 50: Informel, Gutaï, Cobra (“Action and emotion, paintings of the ’50s: Informalism, Gutai, Cobra”), National Museum of Art, Osaka, Japan
1987: Recent Acquisitions 1985–6, The National Museum of Art, Osaka, Japan
1989: Kaiga to moji: Kakareta moji/kakareta e (“Painting and writing: lettering to be painted/painting to be written”), Hakodate Museum of Art, Hokkaido, Japan
1989: Sumi no sekai ten (“The World of Ink Exhibition”), Seibu Hall at the Otsu Seibu Department Store, Shiga, Japan
1992: Calligraphy and Painting: The Passionate Age: 1945–1969 at O Art Museum, Tokyo, Japan
1998: Aspects of Line, The National Museum of Art, Osaka, Japan
2000: Mirukoto no saihakken—Motto bijutsu o tanoshimu tameni (“Rediscovering the Act of Seeing—Getting More Enjoyment Out of Art”), Okayama Prefectural Museum of Art, Okayama, Japan
2002: Sengo Okayama no bijutsu: Zen’ei tachi no sugata (“Art in Postwar Okayama: The Pioneering Figures”), Okayama Prefectural Museum of Art, Okayama, Japan
2016: A Feverish Era: Art Informel and the Expansion of Japanese Artistic Expression in the 1950s and ’60s, The National Museum of Modern Art, Kyoto, Kyoto, Japan
2019: Japanese Nudes, Japan Museum SieboldHuis, Leiden, Netherlands
2019: Collection 1940s-1970s, The Museum of Modern Art, New York, United States

Selected public and private collections 
The National Museum of Modern Art, Kyoto (Kyoto)
The National Museum of Art, Osaka (Osaka)
Ohara Museum of Art (Kurashiki)
Nara Prefectural Museum of Art (Nara)
The Museum of Modern Art (New York)
The New York Public Library (New York)
Bombas Gens Centre d’Art (Valencia)

External links 
Shigeru Onishi: Emanating Hatred by Photography Historian Ryuichi Kaneko
Shigeru Onishi: The Possibility of Existence at Foam Fotografiemuseum Amsterdam
Shigeru Onishi: In Search of Meta-Infinite at Bombas Gens Centre d'Art

References

Japanese artists
1928 births
1994 deaths